Pulla is a village in Eluru district of the Indian state of Andhra Pradesh. It is situated in Bhimadole mandal of Eluru revenue division.

Demographics 

 Census of India, Pulla had a population of 13043. The total population constitute, 6497 males and 6546 females with a sex ratio of 1008 females per 1000 males. 1265 children are in the age group of 0–6 years, with sex ratio of 940 The average literacy rate stands at 70.75%.

References

Sources 

 "List of Sub-Districts". Census of India. Archived from the original on 14 May 2007. Retrieved 2007-05-25.

Villages in Eluru district